The Journal of Environment & Development is a quarterly peer-reviewed academic journal that covers research in the fields of environmental studies and international policy. The journal's editor-in-chief is Raymond Clémençon (Bren School of Environmental Science and Management). It was established in 1992 and is currently published by SAGE Publications.

Abstracting and indexing 
The Journal of Environment & Development is abstracted and indexed in:

According to the Journal Citation Reports, the journal has a 2014 impact factor of 2.313, ranking it 17th out of 57 journals in the category "Planning & Development" and 42nd out of 108 journals in the category "Environmental Studies".

References

External links 
 

SAGE Publishing academic journals
English-language journals
Environmental social science journals
Quarterly journals
Publications established in 1992
Globalization-related journals
Development studies journals